If, often referred to as If 1, is the eponymous debut album by English jazz rock band If. It was released in October 1970 on the Island Records label in the UK and Capitol Records in the US. The original artwork and the if logo, which was an award-winning design, were by CCS Advertising Associates.

It was re-issued as a CD first in 1995 by an obscure label (OSA), then in 1997 by Island and finally in 2006 on Repertoire Records with two bonus tracks and liner notes by UK music critic Chris Welch.

Track listing

Side one
 "I'm Reaching Out on All Sides" (Quincy, Fishman) – 5:14
 "What Did I Say About the Box, Jack?" (Dick Morrissey) – 8:20
 "What Can a Friend Say?" (Dave Quincy) – 6:28

Side two
 "Woman Can You See (What This Big Thing Is All About)" (J. W. Hodkinson) – 4:01
 "Raise the Level of Your Conscious Mind" (Fishman, Marsala) – 3:11
 "Dockland" (Daryl Runswick) – 5:21
 "The Promised Land" (Dave Quincy) – 4:31

Bonus tracks on the Repertoire issue
 "Raise the Level of Your Conscious Mind" (single version) (Fishman, Marsala) – 3:17
 "I'm Reaching Out on All Sides" (single version) (Quincy, Fishman) – 5:44

Personnel
 J. W. Hodkinson – lead vocals, percussion
 Dick Morrissey – tenor and soprano saxophones, flute
 Dave Quincy – tenor and alto saxophones, flute
 Terry Smith – guitar
 John Mealing – organ, backing vocals, piano
 Jim Richardson – bass
 Dennis Elliott – drums
 Frank Owen – Sound

References

External links 
Review by Jim Newsom

1970 debut albums
If (band) albums
Island Records albums
Capitol Records albums